Ašvieniai are divine twins in the Lithuanian mythology, identical to Latvian Dieva dēli and the Baltic counterparts of Vedic Ashvins. Both names derive from the same Proto-Indo-European root for the horse – *ék̂wos: Old Lithuanian ašva and Sanskrit ashva mean "horse". Like the Greek Dioscuri Castor and Pollux, they are reflexes of a common Indo-European mytheme, the Divine Twins.

Ašvieniai are represented as pulling a carriage of Saulė (the Sun) through the sky. Ašvieniai, depicted as žirgeliai or little horses, are common motifs on Lithuanian rooftops, placed for protection of the house. Similar motifs can also be found on beehives, harnesses, bed frames, and other household objects. Ašvieniai are related to Lithuanian Ūsinis and Latvian Ūsiņš (cf. Vedic Ushas), gods of horses. Usins, one of the Ašvieniai, is described as driving a solar chariot pulled across the sky by a pair of white horses.

References

See also
 Proto-Indo-European mythology
 Baltic mythology
 Prussian mythology
 Lithuanian mythology

Lithuanian gods
Horses in mythology
Divine twins